Murāqabah  (: "to observe") is an Islamic methodology, whose aim is a transcendental union with God. According to tradition, it is said to have been the practice of Muhammad during his stay in the Cave of Hira before he met Jibreel.

Etymology and meaning 
The base has the meaning of guarding and watching over with the expectation of noticing any change, unique qualities or abnormalities of a given thing. The word is also on verb scale three, which gives a connotation of exaggeration, overexertion, and partnership. This then implies that the one who is doing  is diligent and hardworking with the expectation that someone else is also doing a similar task.

In ancient Arabic, the word  referred to one who would watch the night sky. They would scan the sky in hopes to see the first signs of early stars to begin their journey. Due to the intense heat and difficult terrain of the Arabian Peninsula, the ability to recognize the constellations and their seasonal divergences was a critical skill. In the classic poem, "the observer of the night is as vigilant as a fish in search of water".

This etymology can be connected to the modern linguistical and technical meaning of what  is understood to be today. Murāqabah is seen to be of twin perspectives, both with a connotation of persistence and exertion. According to al-Qushayrī and al-Jurjānī murāqabah is for one to be aware that their Lord is perpetually aware of His subordinates. Not only is the person continuously in a state of mindfulness but they are also cognizant that their Lord is aware as well, creating a reciprocal relation.

Decorum and etiquette 
One of the most significant sentiments of the great philosopher and theologian Al-Ghāzālī centers around God-consciousness; he propagates that it is the obligation of the creation to be in constant awareness of its Creator. That is to constantly obey him. The Creator's eternal knowledge encompasses the ephemeral existence of mortals, from before their conception to the ages after they have passed on. His Knowledge envelops the external, the internal and the metaphysical. He is the Lord and Creator, Glorified Be He. Once one understands this, they must follow a level of etiquette and protocol which are but not limited to:

 Having humility (ar. ) and modesty (ar. ).

 Staying silent and only speaking when appropriate, as it is mentioned in the narration, “the one who believes in Allah and the Last Day should only speak good or stay quiet”.

 Resolve to do the best that one can in every action.

 Rush to do good deeds and avoiding sin.

 To be content with what one must deal with daily (ar. ).

 Continuous reflection on one's internal state and the world around them.

 Standing up for the truth.

To continue to progress in  one must be consistent for a lengthy period of time to experience the aforementioned benefits. Although it may prove difficult in the beginning, one may always regain their state of mindfulness after recognizing a change from their initial state.

Stages 
The categorization is an arbitrary one, and each level is generally further divided into several sublevels. During the process of enlightenment, some stages can merge or overlap each other.

  - Become one or annihilated in or with the master or teacher.
   - Become one and annihilated with the Message or Messenger.
  - Become one and annihilated with or in Quran and its commandments.
  - Become one and annihilated in or with God.

Ghanūd 
This is the starting level of meditation. A person who starts meditation often enters a somnolent or sleep state. With the passage of time, the person goes into a state between sleep and wakefulness. The person can remember seeing something but not specifically what it is. This topic is well known and practiced among secular scholars of dream interpretation.

ʾIdrāk 
During  ( "cognition"), with continuous practice of meditation, the sleepiness from meditation decreases. When the conscious mind is not suppressed by sleep and is able to focus, the person can receive the spiritual knowledge from his subconscious mind. At this stage, the person is unable to see or hear anything but is able to experience or perceive it.

Wurūd 
During  ( "coming, beginning"), when  (experience) becomes deep, it is exhibited as sight. The stage of  starts when mental concentration is sustained and somnolence is at its minimum. As soon as the mind is focused, the spiritual eye is activated. The conscious mind is not used to see through the spiritual eye so concentration comes and goes. Gradually, the mind gets used to this kind of visions, and the mental focus is sustained. With practice, the visions/experience becomes so deep that the person starts considering himself a part of the experience rather than considering himself an observer.

Gnosis of the universe

Kashf / ʾilhām 
In the beginning, this occurs suddenly, without personal control. With practice, the mind gets so energized that it can get this knowledge by will.

Shuhūd 
With  ("evidence") a person can get any information about any event/person at will. This stage is broadly categorized according to activation of the senses:

 The person can see things anywhere in the universe
 The person can hear things anywhere in the universe
 The person can smell things anywhere in the universe
 The person can touch things anywhere in the universe.

Fatḥ 
With  ("opening, victory") closing eyes is no longer necessary for meditation. The person is freed from both space and time and can see/hear/taste/touch anything present anywhere in time and space.

Gnosis of Allah

Fanāʾ 

During  ("extinction, annihilation"), through a series of stages and subjective experiences, this process of absorbation develops until complete annihilation of the self takes place, and the person becomes , the "perfect man". It is the disintegration of a person's narrow self-concept, social self and limited intellect (feeling like a drop of water aware of being part of the ocean).

Sair illallah 
During  ("journey towards the God") the person starts his spiritual journey towards the ultimate reality of the universe, God. It is also called .

Fana fillah 
 ("extinction of the self in God") is one of the important phases of mystical experience is attained by the grace of God by a traveler on the mystical path. Now, the person becomes extinct in the will of God. It is important to mention that this is not incarnation or union. Most Sufis passing through this experience have preferred to live in the greatest depth of silence, which transcends all forms and sounds and to enjoy their union with the beloved.
This is what the Sufis call "the passing-away of passing-away". The mystic is now wrapped in contemplation of the divine essence.
It is a sort of oblivion of unconsciousness. Since two negatives make one positive, the pilgrim at this stage regains the individuality he had when he started the journey. The only difference is that in the beginning, he was self-conscious, but after having reposed in the Divine Being, he regains that sort of individuality that is God-consciousness or absorbation in God.

Sair min Allah 
During  ("journey from the God") the person comes back to his existence. It is also called . What happens is the person's awareness of God increases so much so that he forgets his own self and is totally lost in his magnificence.

Baqaa billah 
 ("eternal life in God The Creator") is the state in which man comes back to his existence and God appoints him to guide the humans. The individual is part of the world but unconcerned about rewards or position in the world. The doctrine is further explained in Sahih Bukhari, which states that God said: 

There is another verse from Qur'an that is used to explain this concept:

When Sufis have come out of the  state and enter , many of them have produced works of unsurpassed glory, especially in the fields of philosophy, literature and music. Such works have crowned the culture of the entire Islamic world and inspired Sufis and non-Sufis for generations. As the great Persian Sufi poet, Hafez of Shiraz, fondly remembered as the "tongue of the unseen", said centuries ago: "He whose heart is alive with love, never dies". The Qur'an says:

See also 
 Nafs
 Tazkiah

References

Further reading 
 Akhtar, Muhammad (2017). Reformation of Character. Union City: Nur Publications. .
 1058-1111., Ghazzālī, (2010). The beginning of guidance: the Imam and proof of Islam, complete Arabic text with facing English translation. Al-ʻAllāf, Mashhad., Ibn Yusuf, Abdur-Rahman, 1974- (2nd rev. ed.). London: White Thread Press. . OCLC 629700834.
 Mim., Keller, Noah Ha. Sea without shore : a manual of the Sufi path. Beltsville, Md. . OCLC 704907779.
 Khwaja Shamsuddin Azeemi (2005) Muraqaba: The Art and Science of Sufi Meditation. Houston: Plato, 2005, 

Meditation
Sufism
Supernatural healing
Sufi philosophy
Spiritual practice
Arabic words and phrases